SwiftOnSecurity is a pseudonymous computer security expert and influencer on Twitter who pretends to be Taylor Swift. As of September 2022, they have over 375,500 followers. The name was chosen due to Swift's caution with regard to digital security. The account has been cited in news articles about computer security. They are a Microsoft MVP, and work as an endpoint monitoring lead for a Fortune 500 company. Their blog contains general computer security advice, with a large amount dedicated to Windows and phishing.

Atlassian 
In December 2019, SwiftOnSecurity tweeted about an issue in Atlassian software that embedded the private key of a domain. This turned out to be a security vulnerability, and was assigned .

References

External links 
 
 SwiftOnSecurity on the Fediverse
 decentsecurity.com, the blog of SwiftOnSecurity

Living people
Computer security specialists
Year of birth missing (living people)
InfoSec Twitter